Carleton Lewis Kealiinaniaimokuokalani Reichel (born June 26, 1962) popularly known as Kealii Reichel, is a popular and bestselling singer, songwriter, choreographer, dancer, chanter, scholar, teacher, and personality from Hawaii.  He has spent his life educating the world about Hawaiian culture through music and dance.

Kealii (pronounced Keh-ah-LEE-ee) Reichel was born and raised on the island of Maui.   Reichel grew up in the town of Lahaina where he attended Lahainaluna High School, however he spent weekends and summers with his maternal grandmother in the plantation town of Pāia.  At the age of 24, Reichel was convicted of theft, and was sentenced to community service, which involved a study of Hawaiian culture.  This marked a turning point in his life, as he decided to devote the rest of his life to the study and promotion of Hawaiian culture.

Reichel was one of the founding directors for Punana Leo O Maui, a Hawaiian language immersion pre-school. He has taught Hawaiian culture and language at the University of Hawaii's, Maui Community College, and he was the Cultural Resource Specialist and curator at the Bailey House Museum in Wailuku.

Hawaiian mele (music)
Reichel studied Hawaiian dance and vocals under Kumu [hula] (dance instructor/choreographer/master) Pekelo Day and Pualani Kanakaole Kanahele, daughter of the kumu hula and Hawaiian scholar "Aunty" Edith Kanakaʻole. He later founded his own hālau hula (Hawaiian dance school) Halau hula o ka Makani Wili Makaha o Kauaula now called Halau Kealaokamaile. He founded this hālau at the age of 18 after graduating from Lahainaluna High School

In 1994, at the age of 32, he recorded and released a collection of Hawaiian traditional and contemporary music entitled Kawaipunahele on his own Punahele Productions record label, and began his career as a Hawaiian music superstar.  Reichel's subsequent albums, Lei Halia (1995), E O Mai (1997), and Melelana (1999),  placed him securely at the top of the Hawaiian music entertainment industry.  He is also featured in two anthology albums released by his record label, Pride of Punahele (1998) and Pride of Punahele 2 (2003).

In 2004, his album of the previous year, Ke'alaokamaile (2003), won four of the top awards at the 27th Annual [Na Hoku Hanohano Awards] (Hawaii's regional equivalent of the Grammy Awards) including Male Vocalist of the Year, Album of the Year, Hawaiian Album of the Year and Song of the Year.

Reichel also won big at the 38th annual Na Hoku Hanohano Awards in 2015, with his album of the previous year, Kawaiokalena. He won five of the top awards: Male Vocalist of the Year, Album of the Year, Hawaiian Album of the Year and Entertainer of the Year and Hawaiian Language Songwriting and Performance. This release was also nominated for a Grammy the same year.

Reichel's style most often includes vocals over a guitar, bass, and ukulele ensemble but may also include a Western (European-American) string quartet violin, viola and cello or traditional pre-1778 Hawaiian instruments.  His vocals include Hawaiian language chanting and singing in both Hawaiian and English.  Stage performances include dance in both traditional and modern hula forms. He also plays the guitar.

Theater
Kealii performed in the Maui Youth Theater production of Jesus Christ Superstar as Judas Iscariot and in the Maui Academy of Performing Arts production of Jesus Christ Superstar as Jesus.

International recognition
Reichel currently has contracts with JVC Victor Entertainment and Atlantic/Time-Warner.  Kealii Reichel's consistent placement in Billboard Magazine's World Music Charts has garnered him international attention.  He has opened concerts for Bonnie Raitt, LeAnn Rimes, Céline Dion, and Sting.  In addition to his regular concerts in Hawaii, he has toured the United States mainland playing in such places as New York at Carnegie Hall and Town Hall, San Diego, San Francisco, Anaheim, Hollywood Bowl, Phoenix, Portland, Seattle and toured internationally with concerts and workshops in the South Pacific, Europe and Asia where he performs to sold out audiences.

Reichel is known not only for his artistry as a performer, songwriter and recording artist, but also for his work as an ambassador of Hawaiian culture to the rest of the world.

Nā Hōkū Hanohano Awards
Favorite Entertainer of the Year
1995, 1996, 2000, 2007, 2015
Male Vocalist of the Year
1995, 1996, 2000, 2004, 2015
Most Promising Artist of the Year
1995
Album of the Year
1995 Kawaipunahele, 2000 Melelana, 2004 Keʻalaokamaile, 2014 Kawaiokalena
Anthology Album of the Year
2006 Kamahiwa: The Kealiʻi Reichel Collection Vol. 1
Song of the Year
2004 Ka Nohona Pili Kai
Hawaiian Album of the Year
1995 Kawaipunahele, 1996 Lei Haliʻa, 2000 Melelana, 2004 Keʻalaokamaile, 2014 Kawaiokalena
Haku Mele (new Hawaiian language composition; award to the composer )
Kuu Pua Maeole (to Keali'i Reichel) 1996, Nematoda (to Puakea Nogelmeier) 1998
Liner Notes Award
2000, 2004, 2006, 2009
Music Video DVD of the Year
2008 Kukahi – Live in Concert

References

External links
Official Site

1961 births
Living people
American male dancers
American male singers
Songwriters from Hawaii
Native Hawaiian musicians
Native Hawaiian people
People from Maui
Singers from Hawaii
Lahainaluna School alumni
Na Hoku Hanohano Award winners
American male songwriters